Admiral John Lesslie Hall Jr. (11 April 1891 – 6 March 1978) was a senior officer of the United States Navy, who served during World War II.

Biography

Education
Hall, son of the literary scholar John Lesslie Hall, was born in Williamsburg, Virginia, and attended The College of William & Mary for three years before transferring to the U.S. Naval Academy where he graduated in 1913. He starred in American football for three seasons at William and Mary and four years at the Naval Academy. He excelled in three sports at the Academy and was awarded the coveted "Academy Sword" for athletic excellence.

Early career
During World War I he trained engineering personnel on the battleship , and was engineering officer of the destroyer . During the years following the war he had sea duty, mainly in destroyers, and served ashore as a Naval Academy instructor.

From the mid-1920s until 1934, Hall was successively an Aide to the Naval District commandant at Charleston, South Carolina, Executive Officer of the submarine tender , Commanding Officer of the destroyer , spent three years with the Naval Academy's physical training and athletics programs, and was a Navigation Officer on the battleship .

Promoted to commander in 1934, he went to the Far East to serve in heavy cruiser , and then commanded the gunboat , and a destroyer division. During the late 1930s, Hall was at the Naval War College, initially as a student, then as a member of the staff. In July 1940 he achieved the rank of captain and was given command of the battleship . This was followed by staff duty with elements of the Atlantic Fleet.

World War II
In mid-1942 Hall was appointed rear admiral for the invasion of Morocco, and was the chief of staff of the Western Naval Task Force during the North African landings in 1942, receiving the Distinguished Service Medal for opening ports and preventing sabotage while commander of Northwest African Sea Frontier.

In February 1943, he became commander of Amphibious Force, North African Waters (Eighth Fleet), expertly cross-training army artillerymen and navy gunners so that his ships' call-fire missions could be conducted in direct support of troop advances rather than at "targets of opportunity."  His concept proved devastating to enemy forces and tank divisions as he led one of the major assault forces engaged in the Sicilian Occupation (9–12 July 1943) and the bitterly contested landings at Salerno (9–21 September 1943).

These bold achievements brought him two awards of the Legion of Merit.  In November 1943, he took command of the 11th Amphibious Force in the United Kingdom, earning the Army's Distinguished Service Medal for his leadership of amphibious Force "O" which landed and effectively supported the Army V Corps on the Omaha Beach sector off the coast of Normandy in June 1944. He received a second Navy Distinguished Service Medal for command of the Southern Attack Force (Task Force 55) during the Okinawa campaign.  In October 1945, he became commander of Amphibious Force, United States Pacific Fleet, receiving the rank of vice admiral a few months later.

Postwar
After the war he was commandant of the Fourteenth Naval District and, in 1948, commandant of the Armed Forces Staff College at Norfolk, Virginia. From August 1951 until his retirement in May 1953, he was commander of Western Sea Frontier, with additional duty as commander of Pacific Reserve Fleet. On leaving active duty, he was advanced to the rank of full admiral on the basis of his combat awards.

General of the Army Dwight Eisenhower, the Allied Supreme Commander of all Allied forces on the Western Front during World War II, gave Hall the nickname "Viking of Assault". General George Patton, who was often a tough critic of fellow military leaders, heaped high praise on him.

Admiral Hall died on 6 March 1978 at the age of 86. The papers of Admiral Hall can be found in the Special Collections Research Center at the College of William & Mary.

Namesakes
The guided-missile frigate  (launched 1981) was named in his honor.

References

1891 births
1978 deaths
College of William & Mary alumni
United States Naval Academy alumni
United States Navy admirals
Recipients of the Distinguished Service Medal (US Army)
Recipients of the Legion of Merit
United States Navy World War II admirals
People from Williamsburg, Virginia
Recipients of the Navy Distinguished Service Medal
Burials at Arlington National Cemetery
Military personnel from Virginia